Llywelyn Goch ap Meurig Hen (fl. c. 1350–1390) was a Welsh language court poet from Merionethshire, in the north west of Wales.

Llywelyn is credited, along with Iolo Goch, with introducing and popularizing the cywydd metre in the north of Wales.

Llywelyn is particularly noted for his elegy to his dead mistress, Marwnad Lleucu Llwyd (Elegy for Lleucu Llwyd).

Bibliography
Dafydd Johnston (ed.), Gwaith Llywelyn Goch ap Meurig Hen (University of Wales Centre for Advanced Welsh and Celtic Studies, 1998)

External links
The tragic tale of Llywelyn and Lleucu:
Lleucu Llwyd and Dolgelynen

Welsh-language poets
14th-century Welsh poets
Year of birth uncertain
Year of death unknown
People from Merionethshire